3C-P (α-Methyl-4-propoxy-3,5-dimethoxyphenethylamine) is a psychedelic phenethylamine. It has structural and pharmacodynamic properties similar to the drugs mescaline, proscaline, and amphetamine.  Little information exists on the human pharmacology of 3C-P, but a psychedelic dosage appears to be 20–40 mg, and is accompanied by stimulant and psychedelic effects such as visual enhancement and distortion. It can be synthesized from syringaldehyde by reaction with n-propyl iodide followed by condensation with nitroethane and reduction.

See also
Phenethylamine

References

External links
Erowid 3C-P Information

Designer drugs
Mescalines
Substituted amphetamines
Entheogens
Drugs not assigned an ATC code
O-methylated phenols